Pattaya Airpark is an airport in Thailand. It is a general aviation airport used by aerobatic pilots.

References

Airports in Thailand
Buildings and structures in Chonburi province